Terra Firma is a Swedish stoner metal band which was formed by Fredrik Lindgren after leaving Unleashed and with Lord Chritus a.k.a. Christian Lindersson, who used to sing in the Swedish band Count Raven and Los Angeles based band Saint Vitus. Terra Firma would later break up and Fredrik would start a new band called Harms Way. Terra Firma also featured the band members Izmo Hedlund on Drums and Nico Moosebeach
on bass who would later move onto Entombed. The band recorded 2 full length albums, a couple of vinyl singles and appeared on a couple of compilation CDs and split 7-inch vinyl. Terra Firma played some gigs in Sweden and did some European tours with band such as Atomic Bitchwax, Cathedral, Orange Goblin, Dozer, Masters of Reality, Blackshine, Dismember, Murder Squad, Entombed and Mammoth Volume.

Band members 
 Lord Chritus - vocals
 Freddie Eugene - guitar
 Izmo Ledderfejs - drums
Nico Moosebeach -  Bass

Discography

Studio albums
 Terra Firma CD (1999 The Music Cartel)
 Harms Way CD (2001 Steamhammer Records)

Singles/EPs
 Spiral Guru Pic Disc 7-inch (1999 The Music Cartel)

External links
 Terra Firma at metal-archives.com (Accessed 2010-07-15)
 Official Terra Firma website (Accessed 2010-07-15)

Swedish musical groups
Swedish stoner rock musical groups